Isaac Henry (born 21 May 1901, date of death unknown) was a Guyanese cricketer. He played in three first-class matches for British Guiana from 1921 to 1925.

See also
 List of Guyanese representative cricketers

References

External links
 

1901 births
Year of death missing
Guyanese cricketers
Guyana cricketers